Myles Falls Horton (July 9, 1905– January 19, 1990) was an American educator, socialist, and co-founder of the Highlander Folk School, famous for its role in the Civil Rights Movement (Movement leader James Bevel called Horton "The Father of the Civil Rights Movement"). Horton taught and heavily influenced most of the era's leaders. They included Martin Luther King Jr., Rosa Parks (who studied with Horton shortly before her decision to keep her seat on the Montgomery, Alabama, bus in 1955), John Lewis, James Bevel, Bernard Lafayette, and others who would create the Nashville Student Movement, Ralph Abernathy, John B. Thompson, and many others.

Highlander co-founder

A poor white man from Savannah in West Tennessee, Horton's social and political views were strongly influenced by theologian Reinhold Niebuhr, under whom he studied at the Union Theological Seminary in New York City. Along with educator Don West and Methodist minister James A. Dombrowski of New Orleans, Horton founded the Highlander Folk School (now Highlander Research and Education Center) in Monteagle in his native Tennessee in 1932. He remained its director until 1973, traveling with it to reorganize in Knoxville after the state of Tennessee shut it down in 1961.

Horton and West had both traveled to Denmark to study its folk schools, centers for adult education and community empowerment. The resulting school in Monteagle, Tennessee was based on a concept originating in Denmark: "that an oppressed people collectively hold strategies for liberation that are lost to its individuals . . . The Highlander School had been a haven for the South's handful of functional radicals during the thirties and the essential alma mater for the leaders of the CIO's fledgling southern organizing drives." (McWhorter) The school was created to educate and empower adults for social change.

The term “communist” was applied to Horton’s teachings and the Highlander School because of the school’s philosophy of bringing whites and blacks together, in violation of segregation laws.  The school advocated for the working class and the poor and the school’s teachings focused on heightening activism.  Rosa Parks was heavily influenced by Myles Horton and the Highlander School.  Just prior to her famous refusal to give up her seat on a bus, Parks visited the Highlander School where she found the “courage to feel we were alone.”(Highlander School 1).

Horton was influenced early on by his work with poor mountain people in Ozone, Tennessee.  From them, he learned that a free discussion of problems, without indoctrination to any preconceived ideas, generated vitality and brought out ideas from within the group. He wanted blacks and whites to meet and improve their lives.  Horton envisioned a place for liberals and Southern radicals to come together.  He applied this concept to the Highlander School in order to create an atmosphere for social change (Ayers 1091).

Horton’s quest to create and maintain the Highlander School was opposed by Southern law enforcement.  In 1959, the school was accused of violating segregation and selling alcohol.  Adults at the school were allowed to leave coins when they took beer out of the refrigerator at the school.  The school was convicted and shut down.  Horton immediately applied for a new charter and reopened the school (Highlander School 2).

Today the Highlander focuses on the social consequences related to environmental problems.
Horton was also heavily influenced by his religious background.  He believed in a society where there was justice for all.  He attended the radical Union Theological Seminary and joined the Social Gospel Movement.  The Social Gospel movement believed that if Christianity’s principles were applied to social problems, there could be a heaven on earth (Braden 26).

In their 1985 documentary You Got to Move, Lucy Massie Phenix and Veronica Selver prominently featured Horton and the Highlander School. Horton also inspired the founding of the Myles Horton Organization at the University of Tennessee in 1986. The group organized numerous protests and events in the Chattanooga, Tennessee area, including demonstrations to counter the Ku Klux Klan, and the construction of a shantytown on campus to encourage the university to divest from South Africa.

Personal life and education

Myles Horton was born in 1905 in Savannah, Tennessee to a poor family. He had two brothers, Daniel and Demas, and one sister, Elsie Pearl. He grew up near Savannah, Tennessee. His parents were Elsie Falls Horton and Perry Horton (Hale 1).

His parents were former school teachers and Presbyterians. His father was a Workers’ Alliance member and his mother served as a respected and socially active community member. Before the birth of their children, Elsie and Perry Horton worked as educators. When standards for being an educator changed (they now required at least one year of high school), they both lost their jobs because neither of them had the required education. After that, they worked several odd jobs, one of which was working in factories as sharecroppers. Myles’ parents were good, peace-loving people who tried to raise their kids as respectful, affectionate and devoted people. They grew up in poverty, but never thought of themselves as lower class. Elsie Falls Horton helped to organize classes for less fortunate people, and tried to have them become more educated people of the community (Brooks 405).

Horton sought to continue his education. He left home at the young age of fifteen to attend high school and supported himself through working in a sawmill and then a box factory. Horton learned the value of hard work through working these jobs. He attended many colleges, including Cumberland University (graduating with his undergraduate degree in 1928), the University of Chicago and the Union Theological Seminary (Brooks 407).

During his teenage years, Horton experienced union organization by holding jobs at a sawmill and as a packer at factories. As a teenager, he demonstrated his activism by holding a strike for higher wages at the tomato factory. Horton attended Cumberland University in Tennessee in 1924 and continued his work with local unions. After college, Horton went to work as a state Student YMCA secretary.[2] In 1929, Horton became familiar with social gospel philosophy while studying in New York City at the Union Theological Seminary. He wanted to find a way in which the social condition could be challenged and changed and education became his nonviolent instrument. At the University of Chicago, Horton learned about the Danish folk high schools. Inspired after his visit to these schools, Horton helped established his own education center, Highlander Folk School, in Monteagle, Tennessee in 1932.[3] He later married Zilphia Mae Johnson in 1935. Zilphia Horton was a constant collaborator with Horton until her death in 1956. Zilphia and Myles Horton had two children. In 1962, Myles Horton married Aimee Isgrig. In January 1990, Myles Horton died at the age of 84 (Ayers 1091).

See also 
 List of civil rights leaders
 Highlander Folk School
 Cumberland Presbyterian Church

Bibliography
McWhorter, Diane. Carry Me Home: Birmingham, Alabama, the Climactic Struggle of the Civil Rights Revolution. New York: Touchstone, 2001. p. 91–95. 
Adams, Frank, with Horton, Myles.  Unearthing Seeds of Fire: The Idea of Highlander. Winston-Salem, NC:  John F. Blair, 1975. 
Glen, John M.  Highlander: No Ordinary School.  Knoxville: University of Tennessee Press, 1996. 
Horton, Myles. The Long Haul: An Autobiography. New York: Teachers College Press, 1998. p. 1. 
"James L. Bevel, the Strategist of the 1960s Civil Rights Movement," a 1984 paper by Randall L. Kryn published with a 1988 addendum in Prof. David Garrow's "We Shall Overcome Volume II" (Carlson Publishing Co., 1989)
Rahimi, S. (2002). Myles Horton. Peace Review, 14 (3), 343-348. 
Ayers, Bill, and Therese Quinn. "Horton, Myles (1905–1990)." Encyclopedia of Education. Ed. James W. Guthrie. 2nd ed. Vol. 3. New York: Macmillan Reference USA,2002. 1089-1091. Gale Virtual Reference Library.Web.15, May 2014.
Braden, Anne. “Doing the Impossible.” Social Policy 21.3 (1991): 26. MasterFILE Premier. Web. 16, May 2014.
Ed. Christopher A. Brooks. "Civil Rights", The African American Almanac. 11th Ed. Detroit: Gale 2011. 401-473. Gale Virtual Reference Library. Web. 15, May 2014.
Hale, Jon N. American Educational History Journal. Vol. 34: 315-329.  Information Age Publishing: Charlotte, 2007. 14, May 2014.
The Associated Press. "Highlander School Proves Ideas Can’t Be Padlocked". Salt Lake Tribune: 9, August 1992: A31. Print. 14, May 2014.
Preskill Stephen. 2021. Education in Black and White : Myles Horton and the Highlander Center's Vision for Social Justice. Oakland California: University of California Press.

Notes

Further reading
 Horton, Myles, With Judith & Herbert Kohl. The Long Haul: An Autobiography. 1990; New York: Teachers College Press, 1998. 
 Horton, Myles and Paulo Freire.  We Make the Road by Walking: Conversations on Education and Social Change. Philadelphia: Temple University Press, 1990.  
 Wallace, John.  "Use of a Philosopher: Socrates and Myles Horton." In: Beyond the Tower: Concepts and Models for Service-Learning in Philosophy. Edited by C. David Lisman and Irene E. Harvey.  Washington, D.C.: American Association for Higher Education, 2000, pp. 69–90.

Video references
We Shall Overcome, Ginger Group Productions, 1988; PBS Home Video 174, 58 min.  Myles Horton discusses Highlander's role, through his wife Zilphia Horton's music program, in promoting the song "We Shall Overcome" to the Southern labor movement in  1930s, and then to the Civil Rights Movement in the 1950s and 60s.

External links

 SNCC Digital Gateway: Myles Horton, Documentary website created by the SNCC Legacy Project and Duke University, telling the story of the Student Nonviolent Coordinating Committee & grassroots organizing from the inside-out
 , by writer/actor/director Robert Ben Garant
  Bill Moyers' 2 hour interview with Myles Horton.
“Thirty Years of Civil Rights Education in the South / Myles Horton,” 1964-03-20, Pacifica Radio Archives, American Archive of Public Broadcasting (GBH and the Library of Congress), Boston, MA and Washington, DC, accessed June 7, 2021.

1905 births
1990 deaths
20th-century American educators
American Christian socialists
American Presbyterians
American civil rights activists
Cumberland University alumni
People from Savannah, Tennessee
People from Monteagle, Tennessee
Presbyterian socialists
Activists for African-American civil rights
American civil rights activists (civil rights movement)